Deathwatch is a character appearing in American comic books published by Marvel Comics. The character is usually depicted as a demonic supervillain and enemy of the third Ghost Rider, Danny Ketch.

Publication history

Deathwatch first appeared in Ghost Rider vol. 3 #1 and was created by Howard Mackie and Javier Saltares.

Fictional character biography
Deathwatch is a Translord from an unknown demonic dimension. Posing as a crime boss in the real world as Stephen Lords, Deathwatch plotted to destroy New York City through a poisonous toxin. After a youth gang called the Cypress Hill Jokers unwittingly stole the canisters containing the biotoxin, Deathwatch contested with the Kingpin for the canisters, and set Blackout against the new Ghost Rider. Deathwatch and Blackout attacked the 75th Precinct police station and stole the biotoxin canisters. They also abducted Paulie Stratton and her fellow Cypress Hill Jokers, battling the Kingpin's men. He instigated a conflict between Ghost Rider and Snowblind, and was revealed as having set Linda Wei and HEART against Ghost Rider. He dispatched ninjas to lure Ghost Rider into a trap, and destroyed an office building in an attempt to kill Ghost Rider. Alongside associates Hag and Troll, Deathwatch murdered Snowblind, and battled Ghost Rider, who killed Deathwatch in battle.

In the course of becoming a personal enemy to the hero, Deathwatch employed several assassins, including countless Deathspawn, all of whom were from the demon world. After meeting his demise at the hands of Ghost Rider for the first time, he was reanimated by the Deathspawn, Hag and Troll. However, he was captured with Hag and Troll by Ghost Rider, Johnny Blaze, and Spider-Man. With Hag and Troll, he was captured by Steel Wind and Steel Vengeance, and the three villains were turned over to Centurious.

Centurious fully resurrected Deathwatch to help in an attempt to steal Ghost Rider's chain.  During his battle with Ghost Rider, Deathwatch revealed that his original (retconned) intent during the events involving the poisonous canisters was to obtain Ghost Rider's medallion of power. He was easily defeated by the combined power of Ghost Rider and Johnny Blaze.

Deathwatch later appeared, alive and well, as a prisoner in The Raft.

The Hood hired him as part of his criminal organization to take advantage of the split in the superhero community caused by the Superhuman Registration Act. He helped them fight the New Avengers, but was taken down by Doctor Strange. In Secret Invasion, he is among the many supervillains who rejoined the Hood's crime syndicate and attacked an invading Skrull force. He was later seen during an attack on the New Avengers.

Deathwatch was seen during the Siege of Asgard as part of the Hood crime syndicate.

During the Fear Itself storyline, Deathwatch and Blackout assisted Sin (in the form of Skadi) in attacking Dayton, Ohio. Since Johnny Blaze was no longer Ghost Rider, a man named Adam performed a ritual in a pyramid in Nicaragua in which one of his followers, a woman named Alejandra, became the new female Ghost Rider, who was able to defeat Deathwatch and Blackout.

During the "Search for Tony Stark" arc, Deathwatch rejoined Hood's gang and assisted in the attack on Castle Doom.

Powers and abilities
Deathwatch is a native of an alien demonic dimension and so derived at least some of his superhuman powers from his non-human heritage. Deathwatch has the ability to absorb life from another creature that is experiencing pain or death and enhance his own health, strength, stamina, agility, and reflexes. He has the ability to physically penetrate a victim's body and disrupt internal organs without creating a surface wound. He also has the ability to absorb and access a victim's short-term memories by penetrating the victim's brain physically with his fingers, and has the ability to derive surges of physical and emotional pleasure from the proximity of death.

Deathwatch is a skilled ninja, and highly proficient in acrobatic hand-to-hand combat, and is an experienced strangler. He is a master planner and strategist, and a skilled acrobat. He employs a wide range of warriors, including being the head of his own criminal combine and a group of ninja warriors. He usually wears a costume of synthetic stretch fabric lined with Kevlar.

In other media

Video games
 Deathwatch appears in the Ghost Rider video game, voiced by Lex Lang.

References

External links 
 

Characters created by Howard Mackie
Comics characters introduced in 1990
Fictional crime bosses
Fictional empaths
Fictional gangsters
Fictional ninja
Marvel Comics characters with superhuman strength
Marvel Comics characters who can move at superhuman speeds
Marvel Comics demons
Marvel Comics male supervillains